WKCU is a Country formatted broadcast radio station licensed to Corinth, Mississippi.  WKCU serves Corinth, Burnsville, and Booneville in Mississippi and Guys in Tennessee.  WKCU is owned and operated by Telesouth Communications Inc.  The station is a member of the Mississippi Association of Broadcasters.

Translator
In addition to the main station, WKCU is relayed by an FM translator to widen its broadcast area.

References

External links
 1350 and 92.9 WKCU on Facebook
 

1965 establishments in Mississippi
Country radio stations in the United States
Radio stations established in 1965
KCU